Khunying Yai Damrongthammasan (1886–1944) was a Thai noble who grew up in Bangkok.  She retired to a Buddhist monastery when her husband, a prominent judge, died.  She met with women at the temple of Wat Sattanat Pariwat and is thought to have written the respected text, Dhammānudhammapaṭipatti (Practice in Perfect Conformity with the Dhamma), which was published anonymously from 1932 to 1934.

References

Yai Damrongthammasan
Yai Damrongthammasan
Buddhist writers
19th-century Buddhist nuns
20th-century Buddhist nuns
1886 births
1944 deaths